1994 U.S. Open may refer to:
1994 U.S. Open (golf), a major golf tournament
1994 US Open (tennis), a Grand Slam tennis tournament